Tomislav Milinković (born 5 June 1984 in Koper, SFR Yugoslavia) is a Croatian handball player, who currently plays for Croatian Premijer liga club RK Umag. He was a member of the Croatian Jr. National Team and played for professional teams in Croatia, Italy and Finland.

Milinković was also the first Croatian to play in the Baltic League, when he signed with Finnish top team Riihimäen Cocks in 2011. 
Despite the club's troubled season, the Croatian goalkeeper played a decisive role in winning the Finnish highest division bronze medal.

Clubs
 RK Umag (2000–05)
 RK Poreč (2005–07)
   Bologna United Handball (2007–09)
 RK NEXE (2009–11)
 Riihimäen Cocks (2011–12)
 RK Umag (2012– )

Honours

Club

Croatian Premier Handball League 
 Runner-up: 2009-10

Croatian Handball Cup 
 Runner-up: 2002-03

Finnish Premier Division 
 Bronze medal: 2011-12

References 

 http://www.lansi-uusimaa.fi/artikkeli/104986-cocks-jatti-sifin-ilman-mitalia
 http://www.eurohandball.com/ec/ehfc/men/2009-10/player/520737/Tomislav+Milinkovic
 http://www.aamuposti.fi/artikkeli/67706-cocksin-nippu-on-jo-kasassa
 http://www.parentium.com/prva.asp?clanak=10767
 http://www.pallamanosecchia.it/2437-Coppa-EHF-RK-Nexe-ancora-imbattuto.html
 http://www.hr-rukomet.hr/novost.php?novost_id=2228

1984 births
Living people
Croatian male handball players
Sportspeople from Koper